Leon D'Souza (born 10 November 1993) is an Indian playback singer. He sings in Hindi, Tamil and Kannada films. He also sings jingles for television advertisements.

Early life 
D'Souza was born on 10 November 1985 into a Goan Catholic family in Goa, India. His vocal timbre gained the attention of Grammy winning composer A R Rahman who cast his voice for the song Hosanna in the movie Ekk Deewana Tha. Leon's maternal grandfather was a violinist and was very well known in his locality in Goa. He was invited to play in Church and at all the local religious meetings. Leon had learnt to play the Recorder, although he doesn't play it anymore. He learnt piano, as it is one of his favorites to listen to. His mother gifted him a keyboard for his birthday and that motivated him to take lessons.

Career 

D'Souza made his Bollywood playback debut with Oscar winning musician A. R. Rahman who made him sing the song Hosanna for the film Ekk Deewana Tha. He was invited by composer and music director Ghibran to sing a song for Tamil film Naiyaandi. D'Souza spent the whole of 2017 touring with Arijit Singh at his global concerts as a guest vocal act.

Discography

References

External links 

 

1985 births
Living people
Tamil playback singers
Kannada playback singers